Hideyo Sugimoto (born 16 February 1938) is a Japanese professional golfer.

Early life 
Sugimoto was born in the Shizuoka Prefecture of Japan in 1938. He started to play golf at the age of 17.

Professional career 
Sugimoto turned professional in 1959. In the mid-1960s, he had much success. One of his first successes was at the 1963 Yomiuri International, the final tournament of the year on the Asia Golf Circuit, where he finished runner-up to American Doug Sanders. Later in the year, in August, he recorded another runner-up performance against an international field, finishing solo second to Kel Nagle at the Lake Karrinyup Bowl in Perth, Australia. In 1965, he won the Japan Open Golf Championship, the country's national open.

As of March 1968, Sugimoto was under a one year suspension by the Japanese PGA. He attempted to make it onto the PGA Tour at Spring 1968 PGA Tour Qualifying School. He was successful. Sugimoto played in fourteen events during the year, including the Masters and U.S. Open. He made the cut in nine events, including the Masters.

In 1969, Sugimoto returned to Japan and had great success, winning six times in his home country and the Taiwan Open. During this era, Australian legend Peter Thomson considered Sugimoto and Kenji Hosoishi to be the best golfers in Japan.

During this the early 1970s, he had success with fellow Japanese professional Takashi Murakami, winning three events with him. Sugimoto's first win on the Japan Golf Tour, the 1973 All Nippon Doubles, was with Murakami. Sugimoto played on tour through the decade. One of his final top performances was at the 1978 Hiroshima Open where he finished second to Masashi Ozaki in a playoff.

Professional wins (18)

Japan Golf Tour wins (2)
1973 All Nippon Doubles (with Takashi Murakami), Suntory Open

Japanese circuit wins (13)
1964 Japan Open, Yomiuri International (not an Asia Golf Circuit event in 1964)
1965 Grand Monarch
1966 Kanto Pro Championship, Golden Match
1969 Japan Open, All Nippon Doubles (with Takashi Murakami), Nippon Series, Aitaka Open, Rolex Tournament, Golden Match
1970 All Nippon Doubles (with Takashi Murakami), Kuzuha International

Asia Golf Circuit wins (3)
1969 Taiwan Open
1972 Philippine Open
1973 Malaysian Open

Results in major championships

Note: Sugimoto never played in The Open Championship or the PGA Championship.

CUT = missed the half-way cut
"T" indicates a tie for a place

Team appearances
World Cup (representing Japan): 1965, 1966, 1967

See also 

 Spring 1968 PGA Tour Qualifying School graduates

References

External links

Japanese male golfers
Japan Golf Tour golfers
PGA Tour golfers
Sportspeople from Shizuoka Prefecture
1938 births
Living people